The 2016 Leinster Senior Hurling Championship Final, the deciding game of the 2016 Leinster Senior Hurling Championship, was a hurling match played on 3 July 2016 at Croke Park, Dublin. It was contested by Galway and Kilkenny, a repeat of the previous final. In 2015, Kilkenny claimed their 70th Leinster crown by defeating The Tribesmen on a scoreline of 1-25 to 2-15.

Match Details

References

Leinster
Leinster Senior Hurling Championship Finals
Kilkenny GAA matches
Galway GAA matches